Antonio d'Aquino (died 10 January 1578) was a Roman Catholic prelate who served as Archbishop of Taranto (1618-1627) and Bishop of Sarno (1595-1618).

Biography
Antonio d'Aquino  was born in Rome, Italy in 1565. 
On 19 February 1573, he was appointed during the papacy of Pope Gregory XIII as Bishop of Sarno. On 2 May 1595, he was consecrated bishop by Alessandro Ottaviano de' Medici, Archbishop of Florence, with Ludovico de Torres, Archbishop of Monreale, and Leonard Abel, Titular Bishop of Sidon, serving as co-consecrators. On 23 July 1618, he was appointed during the papacy of Pope Gregory XIII as Archbishop of Taranto. He served as Archbishop of Taranto until his death on 27 August 1627.

Episcopal succession
While bishop, he was the principal co-consecrator of:

References

External links and additional sources
 (for Chronology of Bishops) 
 (for Chronology of Bishops) 

17th-century Roman Catholic archbishops in the Kingdom of Naples
Bishops appointed by Pope Gregory XIII
1565 births
1627 deaths